William Henry Parsons (April 23, 1826 – October 3, 1907) was an American newspaper editor and legislator who served as a Confederate States Army colonel during the American Civil War. He was the brother of Albert Parsons, a pioneer American socialist/anarchist and newspaper editor who also served in the Confederate Army, and the brother-in-law of Lucy Parsons, American labor organizer and socialist/communist.

Biography
Although born in New Jersey, Parsons grew up in Montgomery, Alabama. He attended Emory College in Oxford, Georgia, but he left college to fight in Mexico under Zachary Taylor. Parsons later worked in the newspaper business in Texas. When the Civil War began, he received a commission as a colonel from Governor Edward Clark. His Fourth Regiment Texas Volunteer Cavalry became the Twelfth Texas Cavalry when the unit was mustered into the Confederate States Army on October 28, 1861. Parsons helped defend Little Rock, Arkansas against a Union army led by Brigadier General Samuel Curtis and Louisiana from Major General Nathaniel Banks. He was recommended for the rank of brigadier general several times.

After the war, he left Texas to investigate the possibility of establishing a Confederate colony in British Honduras. He returned to be elected to the Texas State Senate. In 1871, President Grant appointed him a centennial commissioner, and he moved to New York.

In 1907, he died at the home of his son in Chicago and was buried in Mount Hope Cemetery, Hastings-on-Hudson, New York.

See also
 Battle of Cotton Plant
 Battle of Goodrich's Landing
 Albert Parsons

References

1826 births
1907 deaths
Confederate States Army officers
People of Texas in the American Civil War
Texas state senators
American military personnel of the Mexican–American War
19th-century American politicians